Take Me to Your Heart Again is a 1982 album by Lulu, released on Alfa Records.

History
The album was produced by Mark London, who had produced Lulu's two previous albums, Lulu (1981) and Don't Take Love For Granted (1978).  Although promo singles of the album cuts "I Will Do If For Your Love" and "Take Me to Your Heart Again" were issued in the UK, with videos prepped for both tracks, the album was only subject to limited release in Australia and Japan, and was not successful.  Lulu would not release another album of new material until the Independence album, released in 1993.

Phil Collins performs on the record.

Track listing
"I Will Do It For Your Love" (Chris Rea)
"Nobody Needs Your Love More Than I Do" (Randy Newman)
"You Had to Be There" (Peter Frampton, Gordon Kennedy, Wayne Kirkpatrick)
"Go Now" (John Keller, Geoff Lieb)
"I Don't Go Shopping" (Peter Allen, David Lasley)
"Let Her Go" (Bob Corbin, David Hanner)
"You're Working Nights Now" (Neil Harrison)
"If You Steal My Heart Away" (Steve Swindells)
"How Can I Believe You" (Neil Harrison)
"Take Me to Your Heart Again" (Jeb Million)

References

1982 albums
Lulu (singer) albums
Alfa Records albums